Erica dos Santos Matos (born May 24, 1983) in is an amateur Brazilian boxer.

Hailing from Salvador, capital of the state of Bahia, Matos first practiced futsal before a classmate invited her to attend boxing classes with him in 2005. Liking the sport, Matos would decide further dedication to it after winning a national championship in Salvador. She was guided by Luiz Dórea, best known for coaching world champion Acelino Freitas.

While Matos fell in the round of 16 of the 2012 AIBA Women's World Boxing Championships, her consistent results in the 2011-12 cycle earned her an International Boxing Association invitational spot to represent Brazil in the 2012 Summer Olympics taking place in London in the Flyweight Division. In the Round of 16 she lost to Karlha Magliocco of Venezuela 14-15.

Matos is married to fellow Salvador boxer Robson Conceição, who also fought in London and would later become the first Brazilian boxing Olympic champion in 2016. The couple have a daughter, Sophia. Following the Games, Matos declared she would take a sabbatical from boxing to take care of her family, while not discarding a return to the sport to fight in the 2020 Summer Olympics.

Achievements
 2013 – Brazilian Women's National Championships 1st place – 51 kg
 2012 – Panamerican Women's Championships (Cornwall, CAN) 2nd place – 51 kg
 2010 – Panamerican Women's Championships (Brasília, BRA) 1st place – 46 kg
 2009 – Panamerican Women's Championships (Guayaquil, ECU) 1st place – 46 kg
 2007 – Panamerican Women's Championships (Duran, ECU) 1st place – 46 kg
 2012 – Three Nations Women's Meeting (Santo Amaro, BRA) 3rd place – 51 kg
 2011 – Stars Tournament (Sao Vicente, BRA) 2nd place – 51 kg
 2011 – 2nd Panamerican Games Qualification Tournament (Quito, ECU) 3rd place – 51 kg
 2010 – Stars Tournament (Moggi das Cruzes, BRA) 2nd place – 51 kg
 2010 – Brazilian Women's National Championships 1st place – 48 kg
 2007 – Brazilian Women's National Championships 1st place – 46 kg
 2010 – South American Games (Medellin, COL) 1st place – 51 kg
 2009 – Brazilian Women's National Championships 1st place – 48 kg
 2005 – Brazilian Women's National Championships 1st place – 46 kg

References

Brazilian women boxers
Olympic boxers of Brazil
Boxers at the 2012 Summer Olympics
Sportspeople from Salvador, Bahia
1983 births
Living people
Flyweight boxers
South American Games gold medalists for Brazil
South American Games medalists in boxing
Competitors at the 2010 South American Games